was a village located in Yūki District, Ibaraki Prefecture, Japan.

On January 1, 2006, Chiyokawa was merged into the expanded city of Shimotsuma.

As of 2003, the village had an estimated population of 9,589 and a density of 483.56 persons per km². The total area was 19.83 km².

External links
 Shimotsuma official website 

Dissolved municipalities of Ibaraki Prefecture
Shimotsuma, Ibaraki